The Heart O'North, or HON, is a high school athletic conference in northwestern Wisconsin. It participates in the WIAA.

Current schools
Current schools in the Heart O'North are:

Former Members

See also
List of high school athletic conferences in Wisconsin

References

External links
Heart O'North Conference Website

Wisconsin high school sports conferences
High school sports conferences and leagues in the United States
Associations of schools